Leesburg Executive Airport at Godfrey Field  is a town-owned public-use airport located three nautical miles (6 km) south of the central business district of Leesburg, a town in Loudoun County, Virginia, United States.

It is a busy general aviation airport in the Washington, D.C. area, and a reliever for nearby Washington Dulles International Airport.

History 
Leesburg Executive Airport was built in 1963 to replace an earlier grass field on the eastern edge of the town, which was owned and used by radio personality Arthur Godfrey for his private DC-3 aircraft.  Godfrey sold the field and shared a portion of the funds with the Town of Leesburg, which used the proceeds to help fund a new airport 3 miles south of town.  The town used matching funds from the FAA.  Originally named Godfrey Field, it is now known as Leesburg Executive Airport at Godfrey Field.

In 1986, the Federal Aviation Administration (FAA) consolidated its 308 Flight Service Stations into 61 'automated' stations (to be known as "AFSS"). The Flight Service Station at Leesburg was scheduled to close, but local lobbying convinced the FAA to rent space from the town and locate an AFSS at the airport.

The airport is currently a designated general aviation reliever airport for Dulles International,  to the southeast, and in 2008 hosted 231 aircraft based on the field and an average of 265 aircraft operations per day. The FAA funded an ILS installation that was completed in April 2011.  The field also has a GNSS GPS approach with vertical guidance available.

In 2015, Leesburg became the first airport in America to operate a remote air traffic control tower, in a test co-sponsored by the Commonwealth of Virginia and Saab-Sensis Corporation. The facility is located and operated onsite during the trial period.

Facilities and aircraft 
It has one asphalt paved runway designated 17/35 which measures 5,500 by 100 feet (1,676 x 30 m).

For the 12-month period ending August 12, 2006, the airport had 96,878 aircraft operations, an average of 265 per day: 99% general aviation, 1% air taxi and <1% military. At that time there were 184 aircraft based at this airport: 85% single-engine, 12% multi-engine, 1% jet and 2% helicopter.

For the 12-month period ending August 12, 2017, the airport had 106,679 aircraft operations, an average of 293 per day. At that time there were 206 aircraft based at this airport, which appears to now be closer to 250 aircraft as of 2021.

Special Flight Rules Area  
Leesburg Executive is located on the outer boundary of the  Special Flight Rules Area, formerly known as the Air Defense Identification Zone (ADIZ) instituted around Washington, D.C. prior to the commencement of the Iraq War in February 2003.  The ADIZ presents very little differences for IFR flights, but special procedures are still required for all VFR aircraft arriving at and departing from the airport.  Due to a special triangular cut-out in the ADIZ circle, they are less onerous than procedures for other ADIZ airports.

Management 
The airport is owned by the Town of Leesburg, a corporate entity within the Commonwealth of Virginia.  The airport is managed by an airport director who is also a Department Manager within the Town staff.  An appointed commission provides oversight for policies and procedures to the Director, as well as advice and counsel to the Town Council.

References

External links 
 

Airports in Virginia
Transportation in Loudoun County, Virginia
Airports established in 1963
1963 establishments in Virginia
Leesburg, Virginia
Arthur Godfrey
Airports in the Washington metropolitan area